Avani Modi is an Indian model and actress. She made her Bollywood debut in Madhur Bhandarkar's drama film Calendar Girls.

Early life
Avani Modi was born and raised in Gandhinagar, Gujarat, and educated at the HL college of Ahmedabad, where she became interested in acting.

Career
Modi's initial exposure was as an anchor on the local television channel ETV. She also began modelling and appearing in commercials for Airtel and other brands, appeared in TV serials on Sony TV and Zee TV, and featured in a video by Altaf Raja. Her Tamil movie debut was in Naan Rajavaga Pogiren, opposite Nakul. As well as Indian movies, she has also appeared in an international short movie, Gulab, which won the Best Film Award at the Canada International Film Festival.

She played role of Nazneen Malik in Madhur Bhandarkar's 2015 film Calendar Girls, about five girls from different regions of India who are selected to pose for the country's most prestigious annual calendar.

Filmography

References

External links

 
 

Living people
Indian film actresses
Actresses in Hindi cinema
Actresses in Tamil cinema
Actresses in Telugu cinema
21st-century Indian actresses
Female models from Gujarat
Year of birth missing (living people)
People from Gandhinagar
Actresses in Gujarati cinema
Actresses from Gujarat